Synthane (code name BAX-3224) is a halocarbon agent which was investigated as an inhalational anesthetic but was never marketed.

See also
 Aliflurane
 Halopropane
 Norflurane
 Roflurane
 Teflurane

References

General anesthetics
Ethers
Organofluorides
GABAA receptor positive allosteric modulators
Abandoned drugs